This is a list of protected areas of the Philippines administered by the Department of Environment and Natural Resources (DENR)'s Biodiversity Management Bureau under the National Integrated Protected Areas System (NIPAS) Act of 1992. As of 2020, there are 244 protected areas in the Philippines covering a total area of about  – 15.4% of the Philippines' total area.

History

The first important legislation that formed the basis of the current system of national parks and protected areas in the Philippines is Act No. 648, enacted in 1903 by the Philippine Commission. This act authorized the civil governor to "reserve for civil public purposes, and from sale or settlement, any part of the public domain not appropriated by law for special public purposes."

A total of eight national reserves had been established on July 26, 1904, pursuant to this law. These are the Lamao Forest Reserve in Bataan, Mariquina Reserve in Rizal, Angat River Reserve in Bulacan, Caliraya Falls Reserve in Laguna, La Carlota Reserve in Negros Occidental, San Ramon Reserve in Zamboanga, Magalang Reserve in Pampanga, and Hacienda San Antonio in Isabela. In the same year, the Forest Act of 1904 (Act No. 1148) was adopted that expanded the scope of protected areas in the Philippines. Among the first of such mountain forest reserves to be declared was Mount Maquiling declared on November 21, 1910.

On February 1, 1932, the National Parks Act (Act No. 3195) was enacted that formally established the national parks system in the country. Mount Arayat became the first national park in the Philippines established on June 27, 1933, following this act.

A series of acts and legislations were passed in the next decades that aimed to further strengthen these policies, including the Revised Forestry Code of 1975 (Presidential Decree No. 705) and Forest Administrative Order No. 7. Following the 1987 Constitution, the National Integrated Protected Areas System Act was enacted which further enhanced the administration and classification of protected areas, and broadened the mandate of the Department of Environment and Natural Resources in enforcing its provisions.

Classification 
They are managed according to the following classifications described in Section 4 of the National Integrated Protected Areas System Act of 1992 (NIPAS Act).

National parks

Natural parks 

 World Heritage Site or part of a World Heritage Site

Natural monuments

Protected landscape and seascapes

Protected landscapes

Protected seascapes

Game refuge and bird sanctuaries

Resource reserves

Managed resource protected areas

Marine reserves

Watershed forest reserves

Natural biotic areas

Wildlife sanctuaries 

 World Heritage Site or part of a World Heritage Site

Wilderness areas

See also

 List of World Heritage Sites in the Philippines
 List of Ramsar sites in the Philippines
 Biosphere reserves of the Philippines
 Environmental issues in the Philippines

References

External links
 
 
 National Integrated Protected Areas System Act of 1992 
 Protected areas (240) in the Philippines from Protected Areas and Wildlife Bureau
 Mount Kalatungan Range Natural Park Official Site 

 List
Philippines
Philippines
Protected areas
Parks in the Philippines
Protected areas of the Philippines
Protected areas